Duncanson-Cranch House is an historic house, located at 468-470 N Street, Southwest, Washington, D.C.

History
The residence is attributed to William Lovering and completed around 1794.  It was listed on the District of Columbia Inventory of Historic Sites in 1964 and it was listed on the National Register of Historic Places in 1973.

References

Houses completed in 1794
Federal architecture in Washington, D.C.
Houses on the National Register of Historic Places in Washington, D.C.
1794 establishments in Washington, D.C.